Dorcadion nobile is a species of beetle in the family Cerambycidae. It was described by Hampe in 1852. It is known from Turkey, and is believed to also be found in Azerbaijan and Georgia.

References

nobile
Beetles described in 1852